The Patriots' Path Council includes Morris, Sussex, Somerset, Union, and Middlesex counties in New Jersey. It was established in 1999 with the merger of the Morris-Sussex Area Council (1936–1999) and the Watchung Area Council (1926–1999). On February 6, 2014, Patriots Path Council absorbed several Scouting units from the dissolved Central New Jersey Council (1999-2014).

The grave of Green Bar Bill lies within the geographic scope of the Patriots Path Council. He is buried in St. Joseph's Cemetery (Row 8, Block I) in Mendham Borough, New Jersey (near Schiff Scout Reservation), at the coordinates .

History

In 2022, the council announced it would sell the Sabattis Adventure Camp to meet its financial obligations.

Organization 
The council is divided into the following districts:

Camps 
The council operates five camps:
 Camp Somers at the Mt. Allamuchy Scout Reservation in Stanhope, NJ (Boy Scouts). The Allamuchy reservation includes 977 acres of woodland.
 Sabattis Adventure Camp just outside Long Lake, NY (Boy Scouts)
 Winnebago Scout Reservation in Rockaway Township, NJ (Boy Scouts and Webelos). Includes more than 450 acres of woodland and adjoins protected lands for additional hiking and camping.
 Camp Wheeler at the Mt. Allamuchy Scout Reservation in Stanhope, NJ (Cub Scout Day Camp and a resident camp for Webelos)
 Watchung Cub Scout Day Camp in Mountainside, NJ (Cub Scout Day Camp)

Sabattis Adventure Camp 

Sabattis Adventure Camp is a Boy Scout adventure camp located in the Adirondack Park in New York State. The camp is owned and operated by the Patriots' Path Council.
The camp, usually in operation from early July to early August, offers Boy Scouts the chance to spend a week at camp, where they participate in various camp activities and work on completing merit badges, or go on a trek, where they hike or canoe for most of the week.

Sabattis Adventure Camp offers week-long canoeing or backpacking treks.  A minimum of seven participants can travel through 20 to 100 miles of wilderness, depending on the ability level of the participants.  Sabattis treks obey the Outdoor Code and Leave No Trace philosophy allowing for an educational and fun experience for all the participates.

All the treks are approved by the New York State Health Department, the New York Department of Environmental Conservation, and the Boy Scouts of America. Sabattis Adventure Camp holds certificates from both the New York State Health Department and the Boy Scouts of America ensuring safe treks.

History 
The land where the camp now stands was originally the estate of swimmer and Olympic Gold Medalist Charles Daniels. Most of the grounds occupied by the camp are the remains of a nine-hole golf course Daniels built for his wife, the most visible portion of which is the parade grounds, next to the camp's trading post, which still looks like the green that it once was. He built the golf course to convince his wife to come up with him. The spot where the flag pole stands now is one of the original putting greens. The actual mansion that the Daniels lived in was located near what is now Family Camp, next to the lake.  The house, called Tarnedge, was dismantled in the early 1970s and few visible reminders of it remain. The Doll House, which he had built for his daughter to play in, still stands, and is used to house staff. The path leading to the Mohawk camp site was the original main entrance to the estate, and the stone wall lining it is still there in fairly good condition, along with the main gates near the main road.

Facilities 
 The Mexican House is the camp office and houses the offices of the Camp Director, Program Director and Business Manager.
 The Health Lodge houses the Health officer and staff members.  The Health Lodge also has the office of the Health Officer.  The Health Officer offers the First Aid MB and CPR training.
 The Barn (built ~ 1910) formally housed the Staff Lounge, the Ranger Shed, Mountain Biking program, Adult/Staff Showers and a large room for program.  The barn was re-painted in 2000. It was condemned in 2011 due to the deteriorating structure of the building, and demolished in 2019, being replaced by a new metal warehouse style storage building.
 The Trading Post houses staff members and contains the Camp Trading Post.
 The Doll House is located down the hill in front of the Trek Center  Is complete with a living room, dining room, kitchen, bath and two bedrooms and a cellar with a furnace.  It was used as a playhouse for Charles Daniels' children and was built on a three-fourths scale. The building is condemned.
 The Trek Center is the base for the Adirondack Treks.  Currently there 4 treks are offered per week.  A unit is assigned a Voyageur guide to guide them through the Adirondacks.  Both backpacking and canoeing treks are offered.  All Trekking activities are directed by the Trek Director. The Trek Center was transferred in 2005 from the Family Camp Building.
 The Commissary The commissary is behind the former putting green and current parade field. It houses all the food needed for scouts to pick up at every meal. All meals are prepared by staff and readied daily. Additionally this building serves as the staff dining hall.

Campsites 

 Abenaki (Trek)
 Apache
 Blackfoot
 Cherokee
 Delaware
 Iroquois 
 Mohawk  
 Mohican 
 Seneca

Summer Camp 
The residential camp program at Sabattis Adventure Camp offers Scouts a chance to have fun while working on merit badges, personal advancement and patrol or troop advancement.

The following Merit Badges are offered:
 Scoutraft: Camping, Pioneering, Wilderness Survival, Orienteering, Emergency Preparedness, Cooking, Geocaching, Leatherworking, Scouting Heritage, and Woodcarving
 Ecology: Environmental Science, Fish & Wildlife Management, Soil & Water Conservation, Reptile and Amphibian Study, Fishing, Forestry, Geology, Weather, Mammal Study and Astronomy.
 Aquatics: Swimming, Lifesaving, Canoeing, Rowing, Small Boat Sailing, Kayaking
 Shooting Sports: Rifle Shooting, Shotgun Shooting, Archery
 Climbing/COPE Climbing

Other in-camp programs include: high ropes COPE course, climbing tour, mountain biking, two 29 ft war canoes, Charley's Mountain hike and overnight, field archery, muzzle loader shooting and many others!

All cooking at Sabattis is in the traditional patrol style over open fires or on camping stoves. Every patrol in camp sends two scouts to pick up their meal ingredients for each meal from the Commissary. At every meal patrol leaders and senior patrol leaders are put to the test... preparation and training goes into a successful days. Scouts are put to the test in meal setup, preparation, cooking and clean-up.

Winnebago Scout Reservation

History
Although the camp was founded in 1941, the history of the property dates back farther. The Lenni Lenape Indians were early inhabitants of the area. During the Revolutionary War iron mines were established. Norwegian immigrants came and built dairy farms in the 1800s. In the early 1900s, Durham Pond was created by intentional flooding to provide water for New Jersey's growing population. In 1916, a troop from Montclair camped by the pond. However, they had to leave after a week due to complications.

The land was purchased in 1940. By 1941, an actual camp was established. The admission fee was $7.50 per scout. Each campsite had an icebox, stove, and a latrine with water pumped from a well. Food was included in the price, but it had to be cooked by the campers. There were 5 campsites, each with room for 30 campers. Scouts slept on mattresses stuffed with straw inside tents.

Facilities 

North End
 Flintlocks Building is where the "Flintlocks BSA, Inc."- a group of retired scouter volunteers- have a state of the art workshop to do camp repairs, build facilities, and make craft kits.
 Winter Lodge is the camp office and used for off-season camping.
 Kiwanis Cabin Sleeps 18. Contains wood stove, electric cooking stove, stainless sink & counter, refrigerator, table and benches, electricity, running water from April 15 – October 15.
 Winnebago Cabin Sleep 12. Contains wood stove, table and chairs, electricity.
 Little Mahee Cabin Sleeps 10. Contains wood stove, table with benches, electricity. 2 adjacent lean-tos are available separately.
 Wink Dousa Cabin Sleeps 20. Contains wood stove, table and benches, electricity
 Bath and Shower House Hot water and flush toilets for all campers. Open year round.

South End

 Corwin Training CenterSleeps 40. Contains gas heat, tables and chairs, separate kitchen area with large gas range, refrigeration, electricity, year round water and restrooms.
 Lewis Cabin Sleeps 12. Contains Wood stove, tables and chairs, electricity.
 Craig Cabin Sleeps 16 in main room + 4 in side room. Contains Propane heat (fee), tables and chairs, electricity.
 Garrity Cabin Sleeps 12. Contains propane heat (fee), tables and chairs, electricity.
 Searing Cabin/Site Cabin Sleeps 4; Lean-to Sleeps  4. Contains wood stove, tables and chairs, electricity, one lean-to.

Campsites 
North End
 Algonquin  
 Cayuga  
 Cherokee  
 Cheyenne  
 Chippewa  
 Comanche
 Delaware 
 Iroquois
 Lenape Site Sleeps 24. Contains Six Lean-tos and Pavilion.
 Onondanga Site Sleeps 24. Contains Six Lean-tos and Pavilion.
 Shawnee Site Sleeps 16. Contains Four Lean-tos.
 Wacabuc 
 Witauchsundin

South End

 CJ Helen
 Craig Field large open group site

Frontier Sites (Primitive sites on east side of Durham Pond)

 Jim Bowie
 Kit Carson

Mt. Allamuchy Scout Reservation

History

Camp Somers

Facilities 
 Cabin #1 Sleeps 14, Double bunks with mattresses. Contains wood stove, 4-burner electric range top, table, tent camping around cabin, latrine.
 Cabin #4 Sleeps 24, Double bunks with mattresses. Contains wood stove, 4-burner electric range top, tables, latrine. Tent camping in site 3A.
 Cabin #5 Sleeps 12, Double bunks with mattresses. Contains wood stove, tables, tent camping around cabin, latrine and close to off-season water supply.
 Cabin #6 Sleeps 12, Double bunks with mattresses. Contains wood Stove, 4 electric burner range top, tables, tent camping around site, latrine and close to off season water supply.
 OA Lodge Sleeps 28, Double bunks with mattresses (4 – back room, 24 – front). Contains oil heat, full kitchen, tables and chairs, tent camping in back, close to lake. Year round water and flush toilet.
 Tuney Lodge Meeting room only, no sleeping. Contains conference table, seating for 25, bathroom, heat and air conditioning flush toilet.
 Dining Hall Capacity:Seats 300 (12 to a table). Contains kitchen available for extra fee in warm months only – May 1 to October 31.
 Bath and Shower House Hot water and flush toilets for all campers. Open year round.
 Ham Shack Camp Somers' Amateur (Ham) Radio Station.

Campsites 

 Site 2 (5 Lean-tos) – barrier-free site near parking lot
 Site 3A
 Site 6a
 Site 3B
 Site 4 (Shelter)
 Site 5 (Shelter)
 Site 6A (Shelter)
 Site 6B
 Site 7 (2 Lean-tos)
 Site 8
 Site 9 (Shelter)
 Site 10A
 Site 10B
 Site 10C
 Site 11
 Site 12A (Shelter)
 Site 12B
 Site 13

Camp Wheeler

Facilities 
 Wheeler Office Sleeps 25 for meetings or 15 cots for sleeping. Contains wood stove or propane heat, electricity, refrigerator, small microwave.
Flush toilets in season. (April 15 – October 15)
 Wolf Den #1 Sleeps 24,Double bunks with mattresses. Contains wood stove, latrine. Tent camping around site.
 Wolf Den #2 Sleeps 24,Double bunks with mattresses. Contains wood stove, latrine. Tent camping around site.

Campsites 

 Site 17
 Site 20 (Shelter)
 Site 21
 Site 22
 Site 23

Woapalanne Lodge

The Order of the Arrow is served by Woapalanne Lodge.

In 1999, the Boy Scouts of America oversaw a number of council mergers. In 2000, the Morris-Sussex Area Council (based in Denville, NJ) and the Watchung Area Council (based in Mountainside, N.J.) underwent such a merger, forming the Patriots’ Path Council – now based out of Cedar Knolls, N.J.

As there can only be one lodge for every council, there were merger meetings between the two lodges (Allemakewink #54 and Miquin #68). Since it was a NOAC year, and Allemakewink was both celebrating its 70th anniversary and hosting a Section Conclave, it did not want to merge immediately. The merger committee decided it was best to merge the lodges in the following year.
The merger committee wanted the number to be low because both prior lodges had lower numbers (#54 and #68), and wanted to incorporate elements of the two previous lodges into the new one. The name decided on was Woapalanne #43, roughly translating to “eagle”. The merger committee decided that the lodge color would be green, and that the totem would be an eagle with outlined feathers. In 2005, however, the totem was modified by the LEC to incorporate the eagle exclusively.

The Winter Banquet was held that January at the Morristown Armory, the first time both lodges met as one.

In the spring of 2001, the lodge held its first Fellowship Day, and two Ordeal Weekends. The lodge decided to have two Ordeal Weekends in the spring (one at each camp) and one Ordeal Weekend in the fall (rotating the camp). The lodge’s first National Jamboree was also in this year. Also starting in 2001, the lodge decided to hold an annual OA Day at each summer camp at which service would be accompanied by a brotherhood conversion ceremony for eligible Ordeal members and a cracker barrel for all brothers attending camp. Peter Keays, the Lodge’s first chief, was elected to be NE-2B Section Chief in that same year – the first in the Lodge’s young history to hold a section position.

In 2002, Woapalanne participated in its first NOAC at Indiana University. The theme was “Test Yourself and So Discover”. Woapalanne was one of only two lodges in the Northeast Region and one of only eight in the country to earn the E. Urner Goodman Camping Award.

In 2003, Woapalanne held its first section conclave for Section NE-2B at Mt. Allamuchy Scout Reservation. The theme was “How Uncas Got His Groove Back.”
In the summer of 2004, NOAC was held at Iowa State University, and a contingent of Woaplanne brothers attended. That same summer, the lodge LEC voted to give a donation to the council for the purchase of a new sail boat for Camp Somers. The boat was named the S.S. Woapalanne, in honor of the donation. In the fall of 2004, the lodge created a new campsite near the chapel at Camp Somers. Site 14 received the name “Woapalanne” to commemorate the lodge’s service in its construction.

In 2005, the lodge participated in its second National Jamboree.

On Jan. 1, 2006, the lodge celebrated its 5th Anniversary. At the NE-2B Section Conclave, our immediate Past Lodge Chief, Joe Maugeri, was voted in as the Section Vice Chief, the second lodge member to hold a section position. In the summer of 2006, a Woapalanne contingent of 8 traveled to NOAC at Michigan State University.

In 2008, the sections were reshuffled, and Woapalanne found itself in Section NE-7A, along with Central NJ, Northern NJ, and Greater NY council lodges.  Our lodge sent a small contingent to ArrowCorps5 to build trails in George Washington National Forest.

In 2009, 22 Arrowmen from Woapalanne traveled to Indiana U. for NOAC 2009.  Frank Caccavale began a two-year stint as Lodge Chief.  Our lodge was designated as a Quality Lodge for the year.

2010 saw us host our first Section NE-7A conclave at Camp Winnebago, with the theme “A Band of Brotherhood.”  It would be the last, as we were, once again, re-sectioned into NE-5A, encompassing most of New Jersey.

In 2011, 16 of us traveled by van out to West Virginia, where we joined Week 2 of SummitCorps, a national service project to build a mountain biking trail in New River Gorge National Park.  We were, once again, named as a Quality Lodge.  Lodge member Bill SanFilippo started the first of 2 terms as NE-5A Section Chief.

NOAC returned to Michigan State in 2012, and Woapalanne was there with a contingent of 15.  We traveled out in 3 minivans and visited the R&R Hall of Fame on the way out.

Woapalanne hosted the NE-5Asection Conclave in 2013, which saw the election of Nick Kaufman as Section Chief.  The theme was “Year of the Arrowman.”  We finished the year having earned JTE Gold Status.

At the start of 2014, we had the largest banquet in our history, with 114 attendees.  Again, we finished the year as a JTE Gold lodge.  Much of the year was devoted to the upcoming centennial celebration of the OA.  With the demise of Central NJ Council and Sakuwit Lodge #2, Woapalanne added those Arrowmen and troops from the area assigned to PPC.  The “new” Brothers have been a decided plus for our lodge.

2015!  100 years old!  For the first time, we offered a package plan for dues and events.  Again, our banquet broke records with 148 in attendance.  In 2015, we secured a National Service Grant, repurposing one of the Wheeler Cub cabins to a STEM/computer facility.  We were also chosen to host ArrowTour, and national road show for our Centennial.  230 people attended.  We named 9 people as “Centurion Award” winners, and 3 were given a Lifetime Service Award.  In August, 53 traveled to NOAC, once again at MSU.

2020
COVID-19 took a toll on Woapalanne, because of the pandemic we lost many members and the size and lodge participation shrunk. We implemented virtual ordeals this year to allow those scouts elected to participate in an ordeal.  

Former lodge Chief Mike Fowler was Elected Secretary of  NE-5 

2021 
Former Section chief and lodge cheif Derek Porter was elected Nation Chief of the Order of the Arrow. Former lodge chief and section secretary was elected chief of NE-5 and soon be the last Chief of this section 

2022
Woapalanne had the privilege of hosting the last Section Conclave for NE-5 as nationals was merging all the  regions into just two separate regions, we held a conclave in June at Mount Allamuchy Scout Reservation and was led by Conclave Chair and Lodge Chief  Connor Nuehause. 

During the summer the OA held NOAC at the University Tennessee Knoxville, Woapalanne lodge was proud to send a contingent of 20 arrowmen led by Bridget Brady to Tennessee for this event 

At NOAC former Lodge Chief and National Chief received the OA Distinguished service award, the highest award that the Order of the Arrow can bestow upon a single Arrowmen. 

2023
Today the lodge is Led by Lodge Chief RJ Bubnoski, Past section chief of NE-5 Mike Fowler was elected as the 2023 Section chief of E17.

References

External links

See also

 Scouting in New Jersey
 Scouting in New York

Local councils of the Boy Scouts of America
Northeast Region (Boy Scouts of America)
Youth organizations based in New Jersey